"The Seventh Son" (also listed as "Seventh Son") is a rhythm and blues song written by Willie Dixon. The title refers to the seventh son of a seventh son of folklore, which Dixon referenced previously in his "Hoochie Coochie Man". The lyrics include:

In 1955, Willie Mabon was the first to record it.  The jazz pianist and singer Mose Allison released it as a single in 1959 and on an album in 1964, calling it one of his "featured numbers".  Johnny Rivers recorded the song as the lead track for his album Meanwhile Back at the Whisky à Go Go in 1965.  Also released as a single, "The Seventh Son" was one of Rivers most popular singles.

Willie Mabon song 
In his autobiography, Dixon described writing several tunes for Mabon, including "The Seventh Son". He noted that Mabon stuck to his arrangement, unlike others who recorded the song, and commented on its background:

Chess Records released the song as a single with "Lucinda" as the B-side, however, it did not reach the record charts.

Johnny Rivers rendition 

In the early 1960s, Johnny Rivers recorded several albums at the Whisky a Go Go, a popular music venue in West Hollywood, California.  "The Seventh Son" was included as the opening track on Rivers' 1965 release Meanwhile Back at the Whisky à Go Go.  In an AllMusic album review, Bruce Eder noted, "[On] the opening track, 'Seventh Son'Rivers takes an approach that manages to intersect with swamp rock, white soul, and garage punk, all neatly wrapped up in three minutes so potent that it shot to the Top Ten on the Billboard Hot 100." The single version peaked at number seven on July 2, 1965, and topped RPM magazine's Top Singles chart.

References

1955 songs
1955 singles
1965 singles
Songs written by Willie Dixon
Chess Records singles
Johnny Rivers songs
RPM Top Singles number-one singles